Patil is an Indian surname used in Maharashtra, Karnataka, Telangana, and Goa. 

In Armenia, the word could be used as a first name for a girl and it means 'snowflake' in the Armenian language.

Notable people

 Anjali Patil, theater and Hindi film actress
 Anuja Patil, a cricketer from Kolhapur, Maharashtra played in Twenty20 Internationals for India
 B B Patil, Member of Parliament, Zahirabad, Telangana
 B. G. Kolse Patil, former judge Bombay High Court
 B. J. Khatal-Patil, former Maharashtra Cabinet Minister, Politician and Independence Activist
 Babagouda Patil, Senior BJP Leader, former MP and Union Minister of Rural Areas & Employment
 Bal Patil, was a Jain scholar, journalist, social activist and Jain minority status advocate from Mumbai, Maharashtra
 Balasaheb Vikhe Patil, former member of the Indian Parliament and member of Indian National Congress
 Bandu Patil (1 January 1936 – 23 August 1988), Olympic Gold medal Men's hockey 1964 - Tokyo
 Basangouda Patil, former Union minister of state for Railways and Textiles 
 Basavraj Madhavrao Patil, MLA, Ausa, Latur, and former Minister for Rural Development, Government of Maharashtra
 C. R. Patil,Indian politician who is state president of BJP Gujarat.
 Chandrakant Bacchu Patil, Indian politician who is state president BJP Maharashtra. He has served as the Cabinet Minister of Maharashtra.
 D. Y. Patil, former Governor of Bihar
 Dilip Walse-Patil, Maharashtra MLA, and Former Finance Minister , Home minister government of Maharashtra
 Dinkar D. Patil, prominent Marathi film director, scriptwriter, and dialogue writer in Marathi film industry
 Dinkar Patil, four times MLA from Tasgaon, Sangli, Maharashtra. Good contribution in irrigation facilities for Tasgaon.
 DJ Patil, Chief Data Scientist of the United States Office of Science and Technology Policy
 Ganpat Patil, a notable actor in Marathi movies and drama.
 Gulabrao Patil, former President Maharashtra state Congress and MP
 H. K. Patil, Former Minister for Rural Development and Panchayat Raj, Government of Karnataka.
 Harshavardhan Patil, former Cabinet Minister for Sehkar from Maharashtra
 Jayant Patil, former Rural Development Minister of Maharashtra
 Kailash Patil, Indian football player playing for club ONGC FC
 Karmaveer Bhaurao Patil, a social activist and educator in Maharashtra, India; founder of Rayat Education Society
 Kavita Patil, an actress who played Sergeant Medawar in the American television show The Unit.
 Krantisinha Nana Patil, elected to the Lok Sabha in 1957 from north Satara constituency from Communist Party of India.  He was the first to give a speech in Marathi on the floor of Parliament
 Krushnaa Patil, an Indian mountaineer. She is known as the second youngest Indian to climb Mount Everest at an age of 19.
 M. B. Patil, Former Minister for Water Resources, Government of Karnataka,
 Manjusha Kulkarni-Patil, a Hindustani classical music vocalist
 Dr Neeraj Patil, Former mayor of Lambeth, London
 Padamsinh Bajirao Patil (born 1940), Indian politician and former home minister of Maharashtra state
 Pandharinath Sitaramji Patil, Politician, Social Reformer, Biographer
 Pratibha Patil, former President Of India
 Pratik Patil, former Minister of State for Mining & coal of India
 Pratik Prakashbapu Patil, a member of the 15th Lok Sabha of India. He is son of former Loksabha member Prakash-bapu Patil & also grandson of former chief minister of maharashtra Vasantdada Patil.
 R. R. Patil, former Deputy Chief Minister of Maharashtra, Home Minister of Maharashtra
 Ram Patil, king of Janjira
 Rana Jagjitsinh Bajirao Patil (born 1971), Indian politician based in Osmanabad and former minister in government of Maharashtra
 Ranjit Patil, former Minister of State Maharashtra 
 Rupatai Patil Nilangekar (born 1957), Indian politician from Maharashtra and former member of parliament, Lok Sabha
 S. R. Patil,  Ex Minister for Infrastructure, Information Technology, Biotechnology, Science and Technology, Planning and Statistics, Government of Karnataka,
 Sadashiv Kanoji Patil (abbreviated as S. K. Patil) (1898–1981) was a former Congress leader from Maharashtra. 
 Sambhaji Patil Nilangekar (born 1977), Indian politician and former minister for food supply in Government of Maharashtra
 Sandeep Patil, former Indian cricket player
 Shalini Patil, former deputy Chief Minister of Maharashtra and widow of Former Maharashtra Chief Minister, Vasantdada Patil
 Sharan Prakash Patil, Former Minister for Medical Education, Government of Karnataka,
 Shivaji Lotan Patil, an Indian film director. He bagged the 60th National Award for Best Director for his Marathi film Dhag.
 Shivajirao Nilangekar Patil, Former Chief Minister of Maharashtra
 Shivraj Patil, former Home Minister of India and Defence Minister of India.
 Shriniwas Dadasaheb Patil (born 11 April 1941), is the present Governor of Sikkim, India, and a member of the Nationalist Congress Party (NCP).
 Smita Patil, Bollywood actress
 Suhas Patil, founder of fabless semiconductor supplier company Cirrus Logic headquartered in Austin, Texas
 Suryakanta Patil, a member of the 14th Lok Sabha of India. She represented the Hingoli & Nanded constituency.
 Swapnil Patil, an Emirati cricketer. He played for the United Arab Emirates in the 2014 Cricket World Cup Qualifier tournament.
 V. L. Patil, politician and independence activist
 Vasantdada Patil, former Chief Minister of Maharashtra & Governor of Rajasthan
 Veerendra Patil, former Chief Minister of Karnataka
 Vijaysinh Mohite-Patil, a former Deputy Chief Minister of Maharashtra.
 Vimla Patil, an Indian journalist, author, activist, columnist, writer
 Vishwas Nangare Patil, IPS officer.
 Vishwas Patil, Indian author, historian, known for his work Panipat (novel about Third Battle of Panipat).
 Vivek Patil, politician of the Peasants and Workers Party of India (शेतकरी कामगार पक्ष). A three-time MLA in the Maharashtra Legislative Assembly.

See also 
List of people with surname Patel
Patel
Patidar
Kurmi Kshatriya
Awadhiya
Patil (title)

Notes

Kannada-language surnames

Marathi-language surnames
Konkani-language surnames
Telugu-language surnames